Flight 201 may refer to:

South African Airways Flight 201, crashed on 8 April 1954
Imperial Airlines Flight 201/8, crashed on 8 November 1961
Copa Airlines Flight 201, crashed on 6 June 1992
JS Air Flight 201, crashed on 5 November 2010

0201